The Golden Gate Bridge is a suspension bridge spanning the Golden Gate, the  strait connecting San Francisco Bay and the Pacific Ocean. The structure links the U.S. city of San Francisco, California—the northern tip of the San Francisco Peninsula—to Marin County, carrying both U.S. Route 101 and California State Route 1 across the strait. It also carries pedestrian and bicycle traffic, and is designated as part of U.S. Bicycle Route 95. Recognized by the American Society of Civil Engineers as one of the Wonders of the Modern World, the bridge is one of the most internationally recognized symbols of San Francisco and California.

The idea of a fixed link between San Francisco and Marin had gained increasing popularity during the late 19th century, but it was not until the early 20th century that such a link became feasible. Joseph Strauss served as chief engineer for the project, with Leon Moisseiff, Irving Morrow and Charles Ellis making significant contributions to its design. The bridge opened to the public in 1937 and has undergone various retrofits and other improvement projects in the decades since.

The Golden Gate Bridge is described in Frommer's travel guide as "possibly the most beautiful, certainly the most photographed, bridge in the world." At the time of its opening in 1937, it was both the longest and the tallest suspension bridge in the world, titles it held until 1964 and 1998 respectively.

History

Ferry service

Before the bridge was built, the only practical short route between San Francisco and what is now Marin County was by boat across a section of San Francisco Bay. A ferry service began as early as 1820, with a regularly scheduled service beginning in the 1840s for the purpose of transporting water to San Francisco.

The Sausalito Land and Ferry Company service, launched in 1867, eventually became the Golden Gate Ferry Company, a Southern Pacific Railroad subsidiary, the largest ferry operation in the world by the late 1920s. Once for railroad passengers and customers only, Southern Pacific's automobile ferries became very profitable and important to the regional economy. The ferry crossing between the Hyde Street Pier in San Francisco and Sausalito Ferry Terminal in Marin County took approximately 20 minutes and cost $1.00 per vehicle, a price later reduced to compete with the new bridge. The trip from the San Francisco Ferry Building took 27 minutes.

Many wanted to build a bridge to connect San Francisco to Marin County. San Francisco was the largest American city still served primarily by ferry boats. Because it did not have a permanent link with communities around the bay, the city's growth rate was below the national average. Experts said that ferocious winds and blinding fogs would prevent construction and operation.

Conception

Although the idea of a bridge spanning the Golden Gate was not new, the proposal that eventually took hold was made in a 1916 San Francisco Bulletin article by former engineering student James Wilkins. San Francisco's City Engineer estimated the cost at $100 million (equivalent to $ billion today), and impractical for the time. He asked bridge engineers whether it could be built for less. One who responded, Joseph Strauss, was an ambitious engineer and poet who had, for his graduate thesis, designed a  railroad bridge across the Bering Strait. At the time, Strauss had completed some 400 drawbridges—most of which were inland—and nothing on the scale of the new project. Strauss's initial drawings were for a massive cantilever on each side of the strait, connected by a central suspension segment, which Strauss promised could be built for $17 million (equivalent to $ million today).

Local authorities agreed to proceed only on the assurance that Strauss would alter the design and accept input from several consulting project experts. A suspension-bridge design was considered the most practical, because of recent advances in metallurgy.

Strauss spent more than a decade drumming up support in Northern California. The bridge faced opposition, including litigation, from many sources. The Department of War was concerned that the bridge would interfere with ship traffic. The US Navy feared that a ship collision or sabotage to the bridge could block the entrance to one of its main harbors. Unions demanded guarantees that local workers would be favored for construction jobs. Southern Pacific Railroad, one of the most powerful business interests in California, opposed the bridge as competition to its ferry fleet and filed a lawsuit against the project, leading to a mass boycott of the ferry service.

In May 1924, Colonel Herbert Deakyne held the second hearing on the Bridge on behalf of the Secretary of War in a request to use federal land for construction. Deakyne, on behalf of the Secretary of War, approved the transfer of land needed for the bridge structure and leading roads to the "Bridging the Golden Gate Association" and both San Francisco County and Marin County, pending further bridge plans by Strauss. Another ally was the fledgling automobile industry, which supported the development of roads and bridges to increase demand for automobiles.

The bridge's name was first used when the project was initially discussed in 1917 by M.M. O'Shaughnessy, city engineer of San Francisco, and Strauss. The name became official with the passage of the Golden Gate Bridge and Highway District Act by the state legislature in 1923, creating a special district to design, build and finance the bridge. San Francisco and most of the counties along the North Coast of California joined the Golden Gate Bridge District, with the exception being Humboldt County, whose residents opposed the bridge's construction and the traffic it would generate.

Design

Strauss was the chief engineer in charge of the overall design and construction of the bridge project. However, because he had little understanding or experience with cable-suspension designs, responsibility for much of the engineering and architecture fell on other experts. Strauss's initial design proposal (two double cantilever spans linked by a central suspension segment) was unacceptable from a visual standpoint. The final graceful suspension design was conceived and championed by Leon Moisseiff, the engineer of the Manhattan Bridge in New York City.

Irving Morrow, a relatively unknown residential architect, designed the overall shape of the bridge towers, the lighting scheme, and Art Deco elements, such as the tower decorations, streetlights, railing, and walkways. The famous International Orange color was Morrow's personal selection, winning out over other possibilities, including the US Navy's suggestion that it be painted with black and yellow stripes to ensure visibility by passing ships.

Senior engineer Charles Alton Ellis, collaborating remotely with Moisseiff, was the principal engineer of the project. Moisseiff produced the basic structural design, introducing his "deflection theory" by which a thin, flexible roadway would flex in the wind, greatly reducing stress by transmitting forces via suspension cables to the bridge towers. Although the Golden Gate Bridge design has proved sound, a later Moisseiff design, the original Tacoma Narrows Bridge, collapsed in a strong windstorm soon after it was completed, because of an unexpected aeroelastic flutter. Ellis was also tasked with designing a "bridge within a bridge" in the southern abutment, to avoid the need to demolish Fort Point, a pre–Civil War masonry fortification viewed, even then, as worthy of historic preservation. He penned a graceful steel arch spanning the fort and carrying the roadway to the bridge's southern anchorage.

Ellis was a Greek scholar and mathematician who at one time was a University of Illinois professor of engineering despite having no engineering degree. He eventually earned a degree in civil engineering from the University of Illinois prior to designing the Golden Gate Bridge and spent the last twelve years of his career as a professor at Purdue University. He became an expert in structural design, writing the standard textbook of the time. Ellis did much of the technical and theoretical work that built the bridge, but he received none of the credit in his lifetime. In November 1931, Strauss fired Ellis and replaced him with a former subordinate, Clifford Paine, ostensibly for wasting too much money sending telegrams back and forth to Moisseiff. Ellis, obsessed with the project and unable to find work elsewhere during the Depression, continued working 70 hours per week on an unpaid basis, eventually turning in ten volumes of hand calculations.

With an eye toward self-promotion and posterity, Strauss downplayed the contributions of his collaborators who, despite receiving little recognition or compensation, are largely responsible for the final form of the bridge. He succeeded in having himself credited as the person most responsible for the design and vision of the bridge. Only much later were the contributions of the others on the design team properly appreciated. In May 2007, the Golden Gate Bridge District issued a formal report on 70 years of stewardship of the famous bridge and decided to give Ellis major credit for the design of the bridge.

Finance
The Golden Gate Bridge and Highway District, authorized by an act of the California Legislature, was incorporated in 1928 as the official entity to design, construct, and finance the Golden Gate Bridge. However, after the Wall Street Crash of 1929, the District was unable to raise the construction funds, so it lobbied for a $30 million bond measure (equivalent to $ million today). The bonds were approved in November 1930, by votes in the counties affected by the bridge. The construction budget at the time of approval was $27 million ($ million today). However, the District was unable to sell the bonds until 1932, when Amadeo Giannini, the founder of San Francisco–based Bank of America, agreed on behalf of his bank to buy the entire issue in order to help the local economy.

Construction
Construction began on January 5, 1933. The project cost more than $35 million ($ in  dollars), and was completed ahead of schedule and $1.3 million under budget (equivalent to $ million today).
The Golden Gate Bridge construction project was carried out by the McClintic-Marshall Construction Co., a subsidiary of Bethlehem Steel Corporation founded by Howard H. McClintic and Charles D. Marshall, both of Lehigh University.

Strauss remained head of the project, overseeing day-to-day construction and making some groundbreaking contributions. A graduate of the University of Cincinnati, he placed a brick from his alma mater's demolished McMicken Hall in the south anchorage before the concrete was poured.

Strauss also innovated the use of movable safety netting beneath the men working, which saved many lives. Nineteen men saved by the nets over the course of the project formed the Half Way to Hell Club. Nonetheless eleven men were killed in falls, ten on February 17, 1937, when a scaffold with twelve men on it, and secured by undersized bolts, fell into and broke through the safety net; two of the twelve survived the  fall into the water.

The bridge opened May 27, 1937.

The Bridge Round House diner was then included in the southeastern end of the Golden Gate Bridge, adjacent to the tourist plaza which was renovated in 2012. The Bridge Round House, an Art Deco design by Alfred Finnila completed in 1938, has been popular throughout the years as a starting point for various commercial tours of the bridge and an unofficial gift shop. The diner was renovated in 2012 and the gift shop was then removed as a new, official gift shop has been included in the adjacent plaza.

During the bridge work, the Assistant Civil Engineer of California Alfred Finnila had overseen the entire iron work of the bridge as well as half of the bridge's road work.

Contributors 
Plaque of the major contributors to the Golden Gate Bridge lists contractors, engineering-staff, directors and officers: 

Contractors

 Foundations - Pacific Bridge Company
 Anchorages - Barrett & Hilp
 Structural steel - Main span - Bethlehem Steel Company Incorporated
 Approach steel - J.H. Pomeroy & Company Incorporated - Raymond Concrete Pile Company
 Cables - John A. Roebling's Sons Company
 Electrical work - Alta Electric and Mechanical Company Incorporated
 Bridge deck - Pacific Bridge Company
 Presidio Approach Roads and Viaducts - Easton & Smith
 Toll Plaza - Barrett & Hilp

Engineering staff

 Chief engineer - Joseph B. Strauss
 Principal assistant engineer - Clifford E. Paine
 Resident engineer - Russell Cone
 Assistant engineer - Charles Clarahan Jr., Dwight N. Wetherell
 Consulting engineer - O.H. Ammann, Charles Derleth Jr., Leon S. Moisseiff
 Consulting traffic engineer - Sydney W. Taylor, Jr.
 Consulting architect - Irving F. Morrow
 Consulting geologist - Andrew C. Lawson, Allan E. Sedgwick

Directors

 San Francisco - William P. Filmer, Richard J. Welch, Warren Shannon, Hugo D. Newhouse, Arthur M. Brown, Jr., John P. McLaughlin, William D. Hadeler, C.A. Henry, Francis V. Keesling, William P. Stanton, George T. Cameron
 Marin County - Robert H. Trumbull, Harry Lutgens
 Napa County - Thomas Maxwell
 Sonoma County - Frank P. Doyle, Joseph A. McMinn
 Mendocino County - A. R. O'Brien
 Del Norte County - Henry Westbrook, Jr., Milton M. McVay

Officers

 President - William P. Filmer
 Vice President - Robert H. Trumbull
 General manager - James Reed, Alan McDonald
 Chief engineer - Joseph B. Strauss
 Secretary - W. W. Felt, Jr.
 Auditor - Roy S. West, John R. Ruckstell
 Attorney - George H. Harlan

Torsional bracing retrofit
On December 1, 1951, a windstorm revealed swaying and rolling instabilities of the bridge, resulting in its closure. In 1953 and 1954, the bridge was retrofitted with lateral and diagonal bracing that connected the lower chords of the two side trusses. This bracing stiffened the bridge deck in torsion so that it would better resist the types of twisting that had destroyed the Tacoma Narrows Bridge in 1940.

Bridge deck replacement (1982–1986)
The original bridge used a concrete deck. Salt carried by fog or mist reached the rebar, causing corrosion and concrete spalling. From 1982 to 1986, the original bridge deck, in 747 sections, was systematically replaced with a 40% lighter, and stronger, steel orthotropic deck panels, over 401 nights without closing the roadway completely to traffic. The roadway was also widened by two feet, resulting in outside curb lane width of 11 feet, instead of 10 feet for the inside lanes. This deck replacement was the bridge's greatest engineering project since it was built and cost over $68 million.

Opening festivities, and 50th and 75th anniversaries

The bridge-opening celebration in 1937 began on May 27 and lasted for one week. The day before vehicle traffic was allowed, 200,000 people crossed either on foot or on roller skates. On opening day, Mayor Angelo Rossi and other officials rode the ferry to Marin, then crossed the bridge in a motorcade past three ceremonial "barriers," the last a blockade of beauty queens who required Joseph Strauss to present the bridge to the Highway District before allowing him to pass. An official song, "There's a Silver Moon on the Golden Gate," was chosen to commemorate the event. Strauss wrote a poem that is now on the Golden Gate Bridge entitled "The Mighty Task is Done." The next day, President Franklin D. Roosevelt pushed a button in Washington, D.C. signaling the official start of vehicle traffic over the Bridge at noon. Weeks of civil and cultural activities called "the Fiesta" followed. A statue of Strauss was moved in 1955 to a site near the bridge.

As part of the fiftieth anniversary celebration in 1987, the Golden Gate Bridge district again closed the bridge to automobile traffic and allowed pedestrians to cross it on May 24. This Sunday morning celebration attracted 750,000 to 1,000,000 people, and ineffective crowd control meant the bridge became congested with roughly 300,000 people, causing the center span of the bridge to flatten out under the weight. Although the bridge is designed to flex in that way under heavy loads, and was estimated not to have exceeded 40% of the yielding stress of the suspension cables, bridge officials stated that uncontrolled pedestrian access was not being considered as part of the 75th anniversary on Sunday, May 27, 2012, because of the additional law enforcement costs required "since 9/11."

Commemorative Bricks 
{
  "type": "FeatureCollection",
  "features": [
    {
      "type": "Feature",
      "properties": {},
      "geometry": {
        "type": "Point",
        "coordinates": [
          -122.475366,
          37.807886
        ]
      }
    }
  ]
}On the 50th anniversary of the Golden Gate Bridge in 1987, individuals and organizations were invited to buy a commemorative brick to fund the 50th anniversary celebration. Those bricks were installed on the ground creating a brick promenade. Its location is shown on the map.

More than 7,500 donors responded, personalizing their brick with inscriptions and tributes.

Unfortunately, 25 years later, for the upcoming 75th of the Golden Gate Bridge, the need for a DDA compliant area, as the slope was too steep, implied remodeling the whole promenade. Doing so, and contractors being unable to properly take bricks out one by one, the brick promenade was demolished and the contributors were unable to get their bricks back. 

However, to honor and respect their contributions, all the donors' names and the inscriptions they had chosen for their bricks have been preserved and written on panels.

The panels are located inside the "Equator Coffees", on its rounded walls. The names and inscriptions are listed in the alphabetical order, to make them easier to read and find.

This website has been keeping a maps view of the original brick promenade and the database of all donors' names and inscriptions, to help find and locate them on the original layout. As of October 2022, the website is currently down.

Structural specifications

Since 1964 its main span length has been surpassed by seventeen bridges; it now has the second-longest main span in the Americas, after the Verrazzano-Narrows Bridge in New York City.

The weight of the roadway is hung from 250 pairs of vertical suspender ropes, which are attached to two main cables. The main cables pass over the two main towers and are fixed in concrete at each end. Each cable is made of 27,572 strands of wire. The total length of galvanized steel wire used to fabricate both main cables is estimated to be . Each of the bridge's two towers has approximately 600,000 rivets.

In the 1960s, when the Bay Area Rapid Transit system (BART) was being planned, the engineering community had conflicting opinions about the feasibility of running train tracks north to Marin County over the bridge. In June 1961, consultants hired by BART completed a study that determined the bridge's suspension section was capable of supporting service on a new lower deck. In July 1961, one of the bridge's consulting engineers, Clifford Paine, disagreed with their conclusion. In January 1962, due to more conflicting reports on feasibility, the bridge's board of directors appointed an engineering review board to analyze all the reports. The review board's report, released in April 1962, concluded that running BART on the bridge was not advisable.

Aesthetics
Aesthetics was the foremost reason why the first design of Joseph Strauss was rejected. Upon re-submission of his bridge construction plan, he added details, such as lighting, to outline the bridge's cables and towers. In 1999, it was ranked fifth on the List of America's Favorite Architecture by the American Institute of Architects.

The color of the bridge is officially an orange vermilion called international orange. The color was selected by consulting architect Irving Morrow because it complements the natural surroundings and enhances the bridge's visibility in fog.

The bridge was originally painted with red lead primer and a lead-based topcoat, which was touched up as required. In the mid-1960s, a program was started to improve corrosion protection by stripping the original paint and repainting the bridge with zinc silicate primer and vinyl topcoats. Since 1990, acrylic topcoats have been used instead for air-quality reasons. The program was completed in 1995 and it is now maintained by 38 painters who touch up the paintwork where it becomes seriously corroded.
The ongoing maintenance task of painting the bridge is continuous.

Traffic

Most maps and signage mark the bridge as part of the concurrency between U.S. Route 101 and California State Route 1. Although part of the National Highway System, the bridge is not officially part of California's Highway System. For example, under the California Streets and Highways Code § 401, Route 101 ends at "the approach to the Golden Gate Bridge" and then resumes at "a point in Marin County opposite San Francisco". The Golden Gate Bridge, Highway and Transportation District has jurisdiction over the segment of highway that crosses the bridge instead of the California Department of Transportation (Caltrans).

The movable median barrier between the lanes is moved several times daily to conform to traffic patterns. On weekday mornings, traffic flows mostly southbound into the city, so four of the six lanes run southbound. Conversely, on weekday afternoons, four lanes run northbound. During off-peak periods and weekends, traffic is split with three lanes in each direction.

From 1968 to 2015, opposing traffic was separated by small, plastic pylons; during that time, there were 16 fatalities resulting from 128 head-on collisions. Although there had been discussion concerning the installation of a movable barrier since the 1980s, only in March 2005 did the Bridge Board of Directors commit to finding funding to complete the $2 million study required prior to the installation of a movable median barrier. Installation of the resulting barrier was completed on January 11, 2015, following a closure of 45.5 hours to private vehicle traffic, the longest in the bridge's history. The new barrier system, including the zipper trucks, cost approximately $30.3 million to purchase and install.

The bridge carries about 112,000 vehicles per day according to the Golden Gate Bridge Highway and Transportation District.

Usage and tourism

The bridge is popular with pedestrians and bicyclists, and was built with walkways on either side of the six vehicle traffic lanes. Initially, they were separated from the traffic lanes by only a metal curb, but railings between the walkways and the traffic lanes were added in 2003, primarily as a measure to prevent bicyclists from falling into the roadway. The bridge was designated as part of U.S. Bicycle Route 95 in 2021.
 
The main walkway is on the eastern side, and is open for use by both pedestrians and bicycles in the morning to mid-afternoon during weekdays (5:00 a.m. to 3:30 p.m.), and to pedestrians only for the remaining daylight hours (until 6:00 p.m., or 9:00 p.m. during DST). The eastern walkway is reserved for pedestrians on weekends (5:00 a.m. to 6:00 p.m., or 9:00 p.m. during DST), and is open exclusively to bicyclists in the evening and overnight, when it is closed to pedestrians. The western walkway is open only for bicyclists and only during the hours when they are not allowed on the eastern walkway.

Bus service across the bridge is provided by two public transportation agencies: San Francisco Muni and Golden Gate Transit. Muni offers Saturday and Sunday service on the Marin Headlands Express bus line, and Golden Gate Transit runs numerous bus lines throughout the week. The southern end of the bridge, near the toll plaza and parking lot, is also accessible daily from 5:30 a.m. to midnight by Muni line 28. The Marin Airporter, a private company, also offers service across the bridge between Marin County and San Francisco International Airport.

A visitor center and gift shop, originally called the "Bridge Pavilion" (since renamed the “Golden Gate Bridge Welcome Center”), is located on the San Francisco side of the bridge, adjacent to the southeast parking lot. It opened in 2012, in time for the bridge's 75th-anniversary celebration. A cafe, outdoor exhibits, and restroom facilities are located nearby. On the Marin side of the bridge, only accessible from the northbound lanes, is the H. Dana Bower Rest Area and Vista Point, named after the first landscape architect for the California Division of Highways.

Lands and waters under and around the bridge are homes to varieties of wildlife such as bobcats, harbor seals, and sea lions. Three species of cetaceans (whales) that had been absent in the area for many years have shown recent recoveries/(re)colonizations in the vicinity of the bridge; researchers studying them have encouraged stronger protections and recommended that the public watch them from the bridge or from land, or use a local whale watching operator.

Tolls

Current toll rates
Tolls are only collected from southbound traffic at the toll plaza on the San Francisco side of the bridge. All-electronic tolling has been in effect since 2013, and drivers may either pay using the FasTrak electronic toll collection device, using the license plate tolling program, or via a one time payment online. Effective , the regular toll rate for passenger cars is $8.80, with FasTrak users paying a discounted toll of $8.40. During peak traffic hours, carpool vehicles carrying three or more people, or motorcycles may pay a discounted toll of $6.40 if they have FasTrak and use the designated carpool lane. Drivers must pay within 48 hours after crossing the bridge or they will be sent a toll violation invoice. The toll violation penalty is $9.40, and additional fees will be added if it is not paid within 21 days.

Historical toll rates

When the Golden Gate Bridge opened in 1937, the toll was 50cents per car (equivalent to $ in ), collected in each direction. In 1950 it was reduced to 40cents each way ($ in ), then lowered to 25cents in 1955 ($ in ). In 1968, the bridge was converted to only collect tolls from southbound traffic, with the toll amount reset back to 50cents ($ in ).

The last of the construction bonds were retired in 1971, with $35 million (equivalent to $M in ) in principal and nearly $39 million ($M in ) in interest raised entirely from bridge tolls. Tolls continued to be collected and subsequently incrementally raised; in 1991, the toll was raised a dollar to $3.00 (equivalent to $ in ).

The bridge began accepting tolls via the FasTrak electronic toll collection system in 2002, with $4 tolls for FasTrak users and $5 for those paying cash (equivalent to $ and $ respectively in ). In November 2006, the Golden Gate Bridge, Highway and Transportation District recommended a corporate sponsorship program for the bridge to address its operating deficit, projected at $80 million over five years. The District promised that the proposal, which it called a "partnership program", would not include changing the name of the bridge or placing advertising on the bridge itself. In October 2007, the Board unanimously voted to discontinue the proposal and seek additional revenue through other means, most likely a toll increase. The District later increased the toll amounts in 2008 to $5 for FasTrak users and $6 to those paying cash (equivalent to $ and $ respectively in ).

In an effort to save $19.2 million over the following 10 years, the Golden Gate District voted in January 2011 to eliminate all toll takers by 2012 and use only open road tolling. Subsequently, this was delayed and toll taker elimination occurred in March 2013. The cost savings have been revised to $19 million over an eight-year period. In addition to FasTrak, the Golden Gate Transportation District implemented the use of license plate tolling (branded as "Pay-by-Plate"), and also a one-time payment system for drivers to pay before or after their trip on the bridge. Twenty-eight positions were eliminated as part of this plan.

On April 7, 2014, the toll for users of FasTrak was increased from $5 to $6 (equivalent to $ in ), while the toll for drivers using either the license plate tolling or the one time payment system was raised from $6 to $7 (equivalent to $ in ). Bicycle, pedestrian, and northbound motor vehicle traffic remain toll free. For vehicles with more than two axles, the toll rate was $7 per axle for those using license plate tolling or the one time payment system, and $6 per axle for FasTrak users. During peak traffic hours, carpool vehicles carrying two or more people and motorcycles paid a discounted toll of $4 (equivalent to $ in ); drivers must have had Fastrak to take advantage of this carpool rate. The Golden Gate Transportation District then increased the tolls by 25cents in July 2015, and then by another 25cents each of the next three years.

In March 2019, the Golden Gate Transportation District approved a plan to implement 35-cent annual toll increases through 2023, except for the toll-by-plate program which will increase by 20cents per year.

Congestion pricing

In March 2008, the Golden Gate Bridge District board approved a resolution to start congestion pricing at the Golden Gate Bridge, charging higher tolls during the peak hours, but rising and falling depending on traffic levels. This decision allowed the Bay Area to meet the federal requirement to receive $158 million in federal transportation funds from USDOT Urban Partnership grant. As a condition of the grant, the congestion toll was to be in place by September 2009.

In August 2008, transportation officials ended the congestion pricing program in favor of varying rates for metered parking along the route to the bridge including on Lombard Street and Van Ness Avenue.

Issues

Suicides

The Golden Gate Bridge is the most used suicide site in the world. Most die from impact trauma. About 5% survive the initial impact but generally drown or die of hypothermia in the cold water.

After years of debate and an estimated more than 1,500 deaths, suicide barriers, consisting of a stainless steel net extending 20 feet from the bridge and supported by structural steel 20 feet under the walkway, began to be installed in April 2017. Construction was first estimated to take approximately four years at a cost of over $200 million. In December 2019, it was reported that construction of the suicide prevention net had fallen two years behind schedule because the lead contractor, Shimmick Construction Co., had been sold in 2017, leading to the slowdown of several existing projects. As of December 2019, the completion date for the Golden Gate Bridge net was set for 2023.

Wind
An anemometer placed midway between the two towers on the west side of the bridge has been used to measure wind speeds. Another anemometer was placed on one of the towers.

Starting in June 2020, reports were received of a loud hum, heard across San Francisco and Marin County, produced by the new railing slats when a strong west wind was blowing. The sound had been predicted from wind tunnel tests, but not included in the environmental impact report; ways of ameliorating it are being considered. An independent engineering analysis of a 2020 sound recording of the tones concludes that the singing noise comprises a variety of Aeolian tones (the sound produced by air flowing past a sharp edge), arising in this case from the ambient wind blowing across metal slats of the newly installed sidewalk railings. The tones observed were frequencies of 354, 398, 439 and 481 Hz, corresponding to the musical notes F4, G4, A4, and B4; these notes form an F Lydian Tetrachord.

Seismic vulnerability and improvements

Modern knowledge of the effect of earthquakes on structures led to a program to retrofit the Golden Gate to better resist seismic events. The proximity of the bridge to the San Andreas Fault places it at risk for a significant earthquake. Once thought to have been able to withstand any magnitude of foreseeable earthquake, the bridge was actually vulnerable to complete structural failure (i.e., collapse) triggered by the failure of supports on the  arch over Fort Point. A $392 million program was initiated to improve the structure's ability to withstand such an event with only minimal (repairable) damage. A custom-built electro-hydraulic synchronous lift system for construction of temporary support towers and a series of intricate lifts, transferring the loads from the existing bridge onto the temporary supports, were completed with engineers from Balfour Beatty and Enerpac, without disrupting day-to-day commuter traffic. Although the retrofit was initially planned to be completed in 2012,  it was expected to take several more years.

The former elevated approach to the Golden Gate Bridge through the San Francisco Presidio, known as Doyle Drive, dated to 1933 and was named after Frank P. Doyle. Doyle, the president of the Exchange Bank in Santa Rosa and son of the bank's founder, was the man who, more than any other person, made it possible to build the Golden Gate Bridge. The highway carried about 91,000 vehicles each weekday between downtown San Francisco and the North Bay and points north. The road was deemed "vulnerable to earthquake damage", had a problematic 4-lane design, and lacked shoulders; a San Francisco County Transportation Authority study recommended that it be replaced. Construction on the $1 billion replacement, temporarily known as the Presidio Parkway, began in December 2009.
The elevated Doyle Drive was demolished on the weekend of April 27–30, 2012, and traffic used a part of the partially completed Presidio Parkway, until it was switched onto the finished Presidio Parkway on the weekend of July 9–12, 2015. , an official at Caltrans said there is no plan to permanently rename the portion known as Doyle Drive.

Gallery

See also

 25 de Abril Bridge, a bridge with a similar design in Portugal
 The Bridge, a 2006 documentary on suicides from the Bridge
 Golden Gate Bridge in popular culture
List of bridges documented by the Historic American Engineering Record in California
 List of Historic Civil Engineering Landmarks
 List of longest suspension bridge spans
 List of San Francisco Designated Landmarks
 List of tallest bridges
 San Francisco–Oakland Bay Bridge
 Suicide bridge
 Suspension bridge

References

Further reading

External links

 
 Bay Area FasTrak – includes toll information on this and the other Bay Area toll facilities
 
 
 
  (A documentary film about the construction of the Golden Gate Bridge.)
 
  (Educational poster.)
 

 
1937 establishments in California
Art Deco architecture in California
Articles containing video clips
Bridges by Joseph Strauss (engineer)
Bridges completed in 1937
Bridges in San Francisco
Bridges in Marin County, California
Bridges in the San Francisco Bay Area
Bridges of the United States Numbered Highway System
California Historical Landmarks
California State Route 1
Bridge
Historic American Engineering Record in California
Historic Civil Engineering Landmarks
Landmarks in the San Francisco Bay Area
Pedestrian bridges in California
Road bridges in California
Roads with a reversible lane
San Francisco Designated Landmarks
Suspension bridges in California
Symbols of California
Toll bridges in California
U.S. Route 101
Tourist attractions in Marin County, California
Works Progress Administration in California
Open-spandrel deck arch bridges in the United States
Steel bridges in the United States
Truss arch bridges in the United States